Ternstroemia penangiana is a species of plant in the Pentaphylacaceae family. It is found in Indonesia, Malaysia, and Singapore. It is threatened by habitat loss.

References

penangiana
Vulnerable plants
Taxonomy articles created by Polbot
Taxa named by Jacques Denys Choisy